WrestleMania is a professional wrestling pay-per-view (PPV) and livestreaming event held annually between mid-March and mid-April by WWE, the world's largest professional wrestling promotion. Since premiering in 1985, 37 editions followed, most recently in Arlington, Texas on April 2 and 3, 2022. WrestleMania was WWE's first-ever PPV produced and is the most successful and longest-running professional wrestling event in history. The event has been shown through PPV since 1985, and has been available to livestream through the WWE Network since 2014 and Peacock since 2021. WrestleMania was conceptualized by former WWE chairman Vince McMahon and named by ring announcer and WWE Hall of Famer Howard Finkel. It is the company's flagship event and along with Royal Rumble, SummerSlam, Survivor Series, and Money in the Bank, it is referred to as one of the "Big Five", WWE's five biggest annual events of the year.

The widespread success of WrestleMania helped transform professional wrestling. The annual event has facilitated the rise to stardom of several top WWE wrestlers. Celebrities such as Aretha Franklin, Cyndi Lauper, Muhammad Ali, Mr. T, Mike Tyson, Donald Trump, Floyd Mayweather Jr., Snoop Dogg, Ronda Rousey, Rob Gronkowski, Shaquille O'Neal, and Bad Bunny, among many others, have made special appearances within the events, with some participating in matches. Rousey herself later became a WWE wrestler and was one of the three women along with Charlotte Flair, and the eventual winner of the match, Becky Lynch to compete in the very first women's match to headline a WrestleMania at WrestleMania 35 in 2019.

The first WrestleMania was held in Madison Square Garden in New York City; the 10th and 20th editions were also held there. WrestleMania III in the Detroit suburb of Pontiac, Michigan was the highest-attended indoor sports event in the world, with 93,173 fans in attendance. The record stood until February 14, 2010, when the 2010 NBA All-Star Game broke the indoor sporting event record with an attendance of 108,713 at Cowboys Stadium, since renamed AT&T Stadium, in Arlington, Texas. In 2016, WrestleMania 32 surpassed WrestleMania III as the highest-attended professional wrestling event ever held in America, with 101,763 fans in attendance at AT&T Stadium, although the company revealed that attendance figures are manipulated for marketing purposes through investor calls. All editions of the event have been hosted in North American cities, with 36 in the United States and two in Canada.

The only WrestleMania in the event's history to not air live and be held without fans in attendance was WrestleMania 36 in 2020 due to the COVID-19 pandemic; it was the first major professional wrestling event to be affected by the pandemic. It was also the first to be held across two nights, with each WrestleMania since becoming two-night events. WrestleMania 37 in 2021 was the company's first event to have fans in attendance during the pandemic, although at a reduced venue capacity, before the company resumed live touring in July that year with full capacity crowds.

Organization

Most WrestleMania events have taken place in large stadiums in large cities, with some in sports arenas. Much like the Super Bowl, cities bid for the right to host the year's edition of WrestleMania. The most-attended events include WrestleMania III (93,173) in Pontiac, WrestleMania VI (67,678) in Toronto, WrestleMania VIII (62,167) in Indianapolis, WrestleMania X-Seven (67,925) in Houston, WrestleMania X8 (68,237) also in Toronto, WrestleMania XIX (54,097) in Seattle, WrestleMania 23 (80,103) in Detroit, WrestleMania XXIV (74,635) in Orlando, WrestleMania 25 (72,744) also in Houston, WrestleMania XXVI (72,219) in Phoenix, WrestleMania XXVII (71,617) in Atlanta, WrestleMania XXVIII (78,363) in Miami, WrestleMania 29 (80,676) in East Rutherford, WrestleMania XXX (75,167) in New Orleans, WrestleMania 31 (76,976) in Santa Clara, and WrestleMania 32 (101,763) in Arlington. Since moving to large stadiums and running WrestleMania Axxess, the event produces a local economy boost for the host cities.

WrestleMania centers on the main event matches, primarily for the WWE Championship – and additional world titles, such as the World Heavyweight Championship (2003–2013) and the WWE Universal Championship (since 2017) – as well as matches involving celebrities such as American footballer Lawrence Taylor or actor Mr. T. Other WWE championships are also contested for, while the match card also includes gimmick matches and matches involving personal feuds.

Since 1993, the winner of the annual Royal Rumble match has been able to receive a guaranteed WWE Championship match at the same year's WrestleMania. With the introduction of the World Heavyweight Championship in 2002, the winner was also given the option to choose between the world title or the WWE championship. The creation of the ECW brand in June 2006 gave the Rumble winner a third option: to choose to challenge for the ECW World Championship. This option was made available from 2007 until the brand was retired in 2010. However, this option was never chosen. The brand split ended in 2011 and the WWE and World Heavyweight Championships were unified in 2013, leaving the former as the only title to challenge for until the reintroduction of the brand split in 2016, which added the WWE Universal Championship as a choice. A women's Royal Rumble match was introduced in 2018, and the winner has the option of challenging for either the WWE Raw Women's Championship or WWE SmackDown Women's Championship. NXT's championships, the NXT Championship and NXT Women's Championship, became additional choices in 2020.

WrestleMania 21 saw the introduction of the Money in the Bank ladder match. This match features six to ten participants and took place at six WrestleManias between 2005 and 2010 before becoming the headline match of its own pay-per-view event, Money in the Bank which incorporated the use of two Money in the Bank ladder matches for both respective WWE brands, Raw and SmackDown. The participant who retrieves the briefcase suspended above the ring wins a contract, which guarantees a world title match at the time and place of the winner's choosing for up to one year, including the following year's WrestleMania. This lasted until 2010 when the Money in the Bank pay per view was introduced and thus the Money in the Bank ladder match was retired from WrestleMania.

Forbes named WrestleMania one of the world's most valuable sports event brands from 2014 to 2019, ranking it sixth with a brand value of US$245 million in 2019 behind the Super Bowl, Summer Olympics, NCAA Final Four, the FIFA World Cup, and the College Football Playoffs.

Commentators
For five of the first six WrestleManias Gorilla Monsoon and Jesse Ventura served as the color commentators (the exception being WrestleMania 2, which was split among three venues and had Monsoon, Ventura, and Vince McMahon split up with guest commentators), while Bobby Heenan, Gene Okerlund, Lord Alfred Hayes and others filled guest roles. For WrestleMania VII and VIII, Monsoon and Heenan provided color commentary. In the mid to late 1990s the commentator team comprised Vince McMahon, Jim Ross, and Jerry Lawler. Since the brand separation in 2002, matches from the Raw brand have been called by Ross and Lawler; the SmackDown matches called by Michael Cole, Tazz, John "Bradshaw" Layfield and Jonathan Coachman, and from 2006 to 2010, the ECW matches called by Joey Styles and Tazz. At WrestleMania 25 the first three-man inter-brand commentary team since the WWE Brand Extension was used, and consisted of Jim Ross, Jerry "The King" Lawler, and Michael Cole. The following year Jim Ross was replaced by Matt Striker at WrestleMania XXVI. At WrestleMania XXVII Jim Ross returned to commentate, along with Josh Mathews and new SmackDown color commentator Booker T; the sudden change of commentary was due to a singles match between regular commentators Michael Cole and Lawler. Howard Finkel, who is credited with coming up with the name "WrestleMania" in 1984, has served as the long-standing ring-announcer and has appeared at every event except WrestleMania 33, but since the WWE Brand Extension, Lilian Garcia, Tony Chimel and Justin Roberts have taken over as announcers for their respective brand matches. Four French commentators were at ringside: Jean Brassard and Raymond Rougeau (WrestleMania 13), Phillippe Chéreau and Christophe Agius (WrestleMania XXX, WrestleMania 31, WrestleMania 32, and WrestleMania 33).

History

1980s

The World Wrestling Federation staged the first WrestleMania on March 31, 1985, at Madison Square Garden in New York City. The main event was a tag-team match between the WWF World Heavyweight Champion Hulk Hogan and Mr. T, accompanied by Jimmy Snuka against the team of Roddy Piper and Paul Orndorff, who were accompanied by Cowboy Bob Orton. The financial and critical success of the event secured the company's status as the most successful promotion in the United States, rising above competitors such as the National Wrestling Alliance and American Wrestling Association. In attendance were business celebrity Sy Sperling and broadcasting executive Tony D'Angelo. WrestleMania 2 was held the following year and took place in three venues across the country. The Nassau Veterans Memorial Coliseum in Uniondale, New York, the Rosemont Horizon (now Allstate Arena) in the Chicago suburb of Rosemont, Illinois, and the Los Angeles Memorial Sports Arena in Los Angeles. They each featured multiple matches that led up to the main event; this saw WWF World Heavyweight Champion Hulk Hogan defeat the challenger King Kong Bundy in a Steel Cage match.

A world indoor attendance-record of 93,173 fans was set at WrestleMania III, which was also the largest paying attendance in the history of professional wrestling at the time. The event is widely considered to be the pinnacle of the 1980s wrestling boom. To make certain that every seat in the Pontiac Silverdome would be filled, WWF decided to exclude the entire state of Michigan from pay-per-view access to the event, which made attending the event the only way for fans in Michigan to see it. The event featured Hulk Hogan defending the WWF World Heavyweight Championship against André the Giant and the WWF Intercontinental Heavyweight Championship match between "Macho Man" Randy Savage and Ricky "The Dragon" Steamboat. The match between Savage and Steamboat would go on to be regarded as one of the best matches in WrestleMania history, is acknowledged by many (including Vince McMahon) as having "stolen the show".

WrestleMania IV was held at the Atlantic City Convention Hall in Atlantic City, New Jersey (though on the broadcast it was billed as being held in the Trump Plaza because the adjacent casino hotel was the event's primary sponsor). The event was an all-tournament event to crown a new WWF World Heavyweight Champion, with four non-tournament matches to fill between the gaps in the tournament rounds. The second round of the tournament featured a rematch of the previous year's main event between Hulk Hogan and André the Giant while Randy Savage went on to defeat Ted DiBiase in the finals. The event returned the following year to Atlantic City for WrestleMania V, in which Hulk Hogan defeated Randy Savage for the WWF World Heavyweight Championship Savage had won the previous year. To date, this is the only time consecutive WrestleManias have been held in the same venue.

1990s

The first time WrestleMania took place outside of the United States was WrestleMania VI, which was held at the SkyDome (now Rogers Centre) in Toronto, Canada. In the main event match, The Ultimate Warrior won the WWF World Heavyweight Championship from Hulk Hogan. The following year, the event returned to the United States for WrestleMania VII, which was originally scheduled to be held at the outdoors Los Angeles Memorial Coliseum. The event was moved to the adjacent indoors Los Angeles Memorial Sports Arena after poor ticket sales, sold on television as being for security reasons related to the Gulf War and Sgt. Slaughter's storyline defection to Iraq. The event saw Hulk Hogan face defending champion Sgt. Slaughter for the WWF World Heavyweight Championship, while The Undertaker made his WrestleMania debut defeating Jimmy Snuka. Following this, The Undertaker was undefeated in 21 of his WrestleMania matches, until he lost to Brock Lesnar at WrestleMania XXX. The next edition, WrestleMania VIII, was held in the Hoosier Dome with Macho Man Randy Savage defeating Ric Flair for the WWF World Heavyweight Championship and Hulk Hogan defeating Sid Justice via disqualification.

WrestleMania IX was the first WrestleMania held at an outdoor venue. It was also the first and only time in WrestleMania history that the WWF World Heavyweight Championship switched twice. Yokozuna defeated Bret Hart to become the WWF World Heavyweight Champion, only to lose it to Hulk Hogan. In the tenth edition of the event, WrestleMania X saw its return to Madison Square Garden. The event featured Owen Hart defeating his elder brother Bret; a ladder match for the WWF Intercontinental Championship also headlined, in which Razor Ramon defeated Shawn Michaels. Bret having been defeated earlier won the WWF World Heavyweight Championship from Yokozuna in the main event. Bret is the first wrestler in WrestleMania history to lose his first match and come back to win the WWF World Heavyweight Championship in the main event. After failing to capture the title from Diesel at WrestleMania XI, Michaels defeated Bret Hart to win the WWF World Heavyweight Championship in a 60-minute Iron Man match at WrestleMania XII. The match was widely praised. The event also saw the return of the Ultimate Warrior who defeated Hunter Hearst Helmsley (later known as Triple H) in the latter's WrestleMania debut.

At WrestleMania 13, a submission match pitted Bret Hart and Stone Cold Steve Austin against one another in a bout that received much acclaim and The Undertaker defeated Sycho Sid for the WWF World Heavyweight Championship in the main event. The match between Hart and Austin is considered by many fans as one of the best professional wrestling matches of all time and has been voted by IGN as the greatest match in WrestleMania history, and was number 1 among their list of top 20 WrestleMania matches of all time. Various other sources also names the match as the greatest WrestleMania match of all time.

At WrestleMania XIV, Austin defeated Shawn Michaels to become the new WWF World Heavyweight Champion in a match that featured Mike Tyson serving as the special enforcer. Although Tyson had been aligned with Michaels and his stable D-Generation X, Tyson revealed to have been aligned with Austin all along as he personally counted the pinfall and declared Austin the winner. The Undertaker and Kane fought for the first time at this event where The Undertaker won. The following year at WrestleMania XV, Austin defeated The Rock to regain the WWF Championship. The event featured the first of three encounters at WrestleMania between Austin and The Rock in the rivalry of the two most prominent and popular stars of The Attitude Era.

2000s

WrestleMania 2000 featured the first-ever Triangle Ladder match for the WWF Tag Team Championship, involving The Hardy Boyz, The Dudley Boyz and Edge and Christian. The main event featured the WWF Champion Triple H successfully defending his title in a fatal four-way match against three challengers: The Rock, Big Show and Mick Foley. This match was billed as having 'a McMahon in every corner' as Triple H was accompanied by Stephanie McMahon, The Rock by Vince McMahon, Big Show by Shane McMahon and Mick Foley by Linda McMahon.

At WrestleMania X-Seven, Steve Austin defeated The Rock and regained the WWF Championship. The event also featured Vince and Shane McMahon in a Street Fight, while Edge and Christian won the WWF Tag Team Championship against the Hardy Boyz and Dudley Boyz in the second Tables, Ladders, and Chairs match. The event was the pinnacle of the 1990s wrestling boom. It was also the first WrestleMania held after the dissolution and WWF's subsequent purchase of the company's rival, World Championship Wrestling (WCW) and the end of the Monday Night Wars.

WrestleMania X8 was the last WrestleMania to be produced under the WWF name, and featured Triple H defeating Chris Jericho to win the Undisputed Championship. Austin, The Rock and The Undertaker defeated Scott Hall, Hulk Hogan and Ric Flair respectively, all of whom had rejoined the company after their stints with WCW. Also Rob Van Dam won his first Intercontinental Championship in his WrestleMania debut.

WrestleMania XIX saw Steve Austin's last match, as he faced The Rock for a third time at WrestleMania, ending their long-running feud. Hulk Hogan defeated Vince McMahon and Shawn Michaels participated in his first WrestleMania match in five years, defeating Chris Jericho. The World Heavyweight Championship was defended for the first time at the event, with Triple H retaining against Booker T, while Brock Lesnar defeated Kurt Angle to win the WWE Championship.

WWE celebrated the twentieth edition of WrestleMania at Madison Square Garden with WrestleMania XX. The event featured The Undertaker (who returned to his Deadman persona) defeating the unmasked Kane in their second encounter and the WWE Championship and World Heavyweight Championship victories of Eddie Guerrero and Chris Benoit, respectively with Guerrero defeating Kurt Angle to retain the WWE Championship and Benoit defeating Triple H and Shawn Michaels to win the World Heavyweight Championship. The event also featured the Rock 'n' Sock Connection, The Rock and Mankind/Mick Foley versus Batista, Randy Orton, and Ric Flair of Evolution where this 2-on-3 handicap match saw The Rock's last match for over seven years, as well as Steve Austin as the guest referee in an inter-promotional singles,  match between the departing superstars Brock Lesnar (who would return to the company eight years later) and Bill Goldberg. The WWE Hall of Fame was reintroduced with an annual induction show held the night before WrestleMania.

At WrestleMania 21, the concept of the Money in the Bank ladder match was introduced; a six-man ladder match that featured a briefcase suspended above the ring containing a contract that guaranteed the winning Raw brand participant a world title match at any time and place of their choosing within one year up to the next year's WrestleMania, in which Edge went on to win this match. In the main events, the WWE Championship and the World Heavyweight Championship passed on to John Cena and Batista respectively by defeating John "Bradshaw" Layfield and Triple H in their respective matches. Eddie Guerrero's last WrestleMania match took place at WrestleMania 21 against Rey Mysterio, before he died later that year. The event also featured the return of Stone Cold Steve Austin after a year-long hiatus, while Kurt Angle defeated Shawn Michaels in a highly acclaimed match.

The Money in the Bank ladder match was also held at WrestleMania 22 as a six-man interpromotional match where the winner would get a world title match of their choosing, regardless of the brand they were on, and this match was won by Rob Van Dam. The main events of WrestleMania 22 featured Rey Mysterio win the World Heavyweight Championship against Kurt Angle and Randy Orton in a Triple Threat Match, and John Cena retains the WWE Championship against Triple H. Edge defeated Mick Foley in a Hardcore Rules match, where Edge infamously speared Foley of the ring apron through a flaming table at ringside. WrestleMania 22 also featured Shawn Michaels defeating Vince McMahon in a No Holds Barred match, Undertaker defeating Mark Henry in a casket match, and Mickie James defeat Trish Stratus to win the WWE Women's Championship.

At WrestleMania 23, the Money in the Bank match expanded to include eight men and would include stars from the revived ECW brand which was won by Mr. Kennedy. John Cena would go on to retain his WWE Championship against Shawn Michaels, while The Undertaker would win the World Heavyweight Championship from Batista. Representing Donald Trump, ECW World Champion Bobby Lashley defeated Umaga, who represented Vince McMahon, in a match billed as the "Battle of the Billionaires" and arbitrated by Stone Cold Steve Austin at WrestleMania 23. This was also the last WrestleMania where the WWE Women's Championship was defended when Melina defeated Ashley Massaro in a lumberjills match.

At WrestleMania XXIV, Shawn Michaels defeated Ric Flair in a highly acclaimed retirement match, while the Money in the Bank ladder match included seven participants from all three brands which were won by CM Punk who also win it again at WrestleMania 25. The ECW Championship was defended for the only time at a WrestleMania event, when Kane emerged as the new ECW Champion in a record 8 seconds, while Randy Orton retained the WWE Championship and The Undertaker won the World Heavyweight Championship for the second consecutive year, defeating Edge. In an encounter that featured major media coverage, boxing world champion Floyd Mayweather Jr. defeated Big Show. The event was the second WrestleMania to be held at an outdoor venue.

WrestleMania 25 featured Chris Jericho defeating WWE Hall of Famers Roddy Piper, Jimmy Snuka, and Ricky Steamboat in a match that featured appearances by Ric Flair and actor Mickey Rourke. Shawn Michaels unsuccessfully attempted to hand The Undertaker his first defeat at a WrestleMania in an acclaimed match, and the WWE Intercontinental Championship was defended at the event for the first time since WrestleMania X8 with Rey Mysterio defeated John "Bradshaw" Layfield. John Cena defeated Edge for the World Heavyweight Championship also involving the Big Show, while Triple H retained the WWE Championship against Randy Orton.

2010s

At WrestleMania XXVI, the professional wrestling career of Shawn Michaels came to an end as he faced The Undertaker in a highly acclaimed re-match of their encounter from the previous year. The event also featured John Cena winning the WWE Championship and Chris Jericho retaining the World Heavyweight Championship. Following Bret Hart's return to WWE in over twelve years since the Montreal Screwjob incident, Bret Hart defeated Vince McMahon in a No Holds Barred match with members of the Hart wrestling family present. The Money in the Bank Ladder match included ten participants from both Raw and SmackDown (the ECW brand was retired in February), and this match was won by Jack Swagger. This was the last Money in the Bank Ladder match to date at WrestleMania event.

WrestleMania XXVII featured the return of The Rock following a seven-year hiatus to serve as host for the event. Trish Stratus competed in her first WrestleMania since the twenty-second edition, teaming with John Morrison and Jersey Shores Nicole "Snooki" Polizzi to defeat LayCool and Dolph Ziggler. Longtime WWE announcers Michael Cole and Jerry Lawler brawled in a match officiated by Stone Cold Steve Austin, while Triple H failed in his attempt to avenge Shawn Michaels' loss to The Undertaker from a year prior. This was the first WrestleMania in history in which both the World Heavyweight Champion and WWE Champion were able to successfully retain their titles. World Heavyweight Champion Edge defeated the challenger Alberto Del Rio in what would be Edge's last match before his retirement on April 11, and The Rock closed out the event saluting the fans after laying out John Cena and The Miz with the signature move Rock Bottom following Miz retaining the WWE Championship. This incident would set up the main event for the following year's WrestleMania.

WrestleMania XXVIII had three matches in the upper card. In the first main event, The Undertaker defeated Triple H in a Hell in a Cell match via pinfall, officiated by Shawn Michaels, extending his WrestleMania streak to 20–0. The second main event featured CM Punk retaining the WWE Championship against Chris Jericho, via submission. The third main event featured The Rock defeating John Cena via pinfall in a "Once in a Lifetime" match, announced a year in advance.

In 2013, WrestleMania 29 had 80,676 fans in attendance, becoming the third-highest attended WrestleMania ever. This WrestleMania had three main events. The first saw The Undertaker extend his undefeated streak to 21–0 by defeating CM Punk. Triple H, with the help of Shawn Michaels, defeated Brock Lesnar in a No Holds Barred match; had Triple H lost, he would have had to retire from in-ring competition. In the final match, John Cena avenged his loss from the previous year by defeating The Rock for the WWE Championship, winning the title a record 11th time and setting a record of four victories as a Challenger in World title match at WrestleMania. Other matches included Alberto Del Rio successfully defending his World Heavyweight Championship against Jack Swagger, and Fandango pulling off an upset by defeating Chris Jericho. In the opening bout, The Shield (Dean Ambrose, Seth Rollins, and Roman Reigns) defeated the team of Big Show, Sheamus, and Randy Orton, in their WrestleMania debut.

WrestleMania XXX was the 30th annual WrestleMania event produced by WWE on April 6, 2014, at the Mercedes-Benz Superdome in New Orleans, Louisiana. The event was the first WrestleMania to be held in the state of Louisiana. It saw Daniel Bryan defeat Triple H in the opening match. Per the stipulation, this gave Bryan a spot in the main event, where he won the WWE World Heavyweight Championship by making Batista submit in a Triple Threat match which also included Randy Orton. It was the only WrestleMania where the WWE Divas Championship was defended, with AJ Lee retaining the title in the "Vickie Guerrero Divas Championship Invitational". WrestleMania XXX also saw the end of The Undertaker's undefeated streak at WrestleMania as he was defeated by Brock Lesnar in what was described as 'the most shocking result in sports-entertainment history'. At WrestleMania XXX, Bray Wyatt's undefeated streak since his debut came to an end at the hands of John Cena. Also, at WrestleMania XXX, The Shield defeated Kane and The New Age Outlaws (Road Dogg and Billy Gunn) in a six-man tag team match, and Cesaro won the first-ever André the Giant Memorial Battle Royal by body-slamming Big Show outside of the ring, in similar fashion to Hulk Hogan bodyslamming Andre the Giant, at WrestleMania III.

WrestleMania 31 was held at Levi's Stadium in Santa Clara, California on March 29, 2015. Brock Lesnar defended the WWE World Heavyweight Championship in the main event against Royal Rumble winner Roman Reigns, with Seth Rollins cashing in his Money in the Bank briefcase, turning the bout into a Triple Threat, ending with Rollins pinning Reigns to win the championship. Other main bouts included Sting's first-ever WWE match against Triple H which he lost, The Undertaker returned and defeated Bray Wyatt to get his 22nd victory at the event's history, Randy Orton defeated Seth Rollins and Rusev lost the United States Championship and his unbeaten streak to John Cena. Another important promoted match was the 7-man ladder match for the Intercontinental Championship, which was won by Daniel Bryan. Also, at WrestleMania 31, AJ Lee teamed with Paige to defeat The Bella Twins in a tag team match, while Big Show won the second annual Andre the Giant memorial battle royal, by last eliminating Damien Mizdow.

WrestleMania 32 was held at AT&T Stadium in Arlington, Texas on April 3, 2016. WrestleMania 32 broke the attendance record at 101,763 as announced by The Rock at the event. In the main event, Roman Reigns defeated Triple H to win the WWE World Heavyweight Championship. Other bouts included the Undertaker defeating Shane McMahon in a Hell in a Cell match. Had Shane won, he would have gained control of Raw, while had Undertaker lost, this would have been his last WrestleMania. Brock Lesnar defeated Dean Ambrose in a No Holds Barred Street Fight, Charlotte defeated Becky Lynch and Sasha Banks to win the inaugural WWE Women's Championship (now Raw Women's Championship), Chris Jericho defeated AJ Styles in a singles match, The League of Nations (Sheamus, Rusev, and Alberto Del Rio) (with King Barrett) defeated The New Day (Xavier Woods, Kofi Kingston, and Big E) in a six-man tag match, Zack Ryder won a 7-man ladder match for the Intercontinental Championship, and The Rock defeated Erick Rowan in a record-breaking 6-second match. Also, at WrestleMania 32, Baron Corbin won the third annual Andre the Giant memorial battle royal, by last eliminating Kane.

WrestleMania 33 took place on April 2, 2017, at Camping World Stadium in Orlando, Florida. It was the first WrestleMania since WrestleMania 29 in 2013 to feature two world championships on the line: Raw's Universal Championship, defended for the first time at WrestleMania, and SmackDown's WWE Championship. The main event saw Roman Reigns defeat The Undertaker in a No Holds Barred match, giving Undertaker his second loss at WrestleMania. Elsewhere on the event's card, Brock Lesnar defeated Goldberg to become the new Universal Champion, Randy Orton defeated Bray Wyatt to win his ninth WWE Championship, and Mojo Rawley won the fourth annual Andre the Giant memorial battle royal, by last eliminating Jinder Mahal. The event also marked the unannounced return of The Hardy Boyz, who won the Raw Tag Team Championship at the event.

WrestleMania 34 was held on April 8, 2018, at the Mercedes-Benz Superdome in New Orleans, Louisiana. In the main event, Brock Lesnar retained the Universal Championship against Roman Reigns. In another main event promoted the match, AJ Styles retained the WWE Championship against Shinsuke Nakamura. Other marquee matches saw Kurt Angle and Ronda Rousey defeat Triple H and Stephanie McMahon in a mixed tag team match, which was Rousey's WWE debut match, and Daniel Bryan had his in-ring return after three years, teaming with Shane McMahon to defeat Kevin Owens and Sami Zayn. Also, The Undertaker defeated John Cena in an impromptu match. In another prominent match, Charlotte Flair retained the SmackDown Women's Championship against Asuka, ending Asuka's two-year undefeated streak, and a 10-year old fan became the youngest WWE champion when he teamed with Braun Strowman to defeat Cesaro and Sheamus for the Raw Tag Team Championship, The SmackDown Tag Team Championship was also defended for the first time at WrestleMania, where The Bludgeon Brothers defeated The Usos and The New Day to win the titles, Matt Hardy last eliminated Baron Corbin to win fifth Andre the Giant memorial battle royal as well as first ever WrestleMania Women's Battle Royal contested where Naomi won by last eliminating Bayley.

WrestleMania 35 was held on April 7, 2019, at MetLife Stadium in East Rutherford, New Jersey. At the event, Kofi Kingston became the first African-born WWE Champion after defeating Daniel Bryan, while Seth Rollins defeated Brock Lesnar to win the Universal Championship. The event also saw the retirement of veteran WWE stars Kurt Angle and Batista. For the first time, the main event of WrestleMania was a women's match, with Raw Women's Champion Ronda Rousey, SmackDown Women's Champion Charlotte Flair, and Becky Lynch facing off in a Winner Takes All Triple Threat match for both championships, in which Lynch emerged victorious.

2020s

For the first time in WrestleMania's history, WrestleMania 36 was taped and held across two nights. The tapings occurred on March 25 and 26, 2020 at multiple locations including the WWE Performance Center in Orlando, Florida. It then aired on tape delay on April 4 and 5. It was originally scheduled to take place solely on April 5 at the Raymond James Stadium in Tampa, Florida and to air live, but was moved due to the COVID-19 pandemic. It was only attended by essential personnel, and was the first WWE pay-per-view event unattended by fans. It was the first WrestleMania to promote the NXT brand. In the main event for Part 1 of WrestleMania 36, The Undertaker defeated AJ Styles in a Boneyard match, which was produced as a cinematic match and was one of two matches not filmed at the Performance Center—this would in turn be The Undertaker's final match. Braun Strowman also defeated Goldberg to win the Universal Championship while Becky Lynch retained the Raw Women's Championship over NXT's Shayna Baszler. In the main event for Part 2, Drew McIntyre defeated Brock Lesnar to win the WWE Championship; after the show went off the air, a dark match occurred wherein McIntyre retained the title over Big Show in a match described by WWE as the "hidden WrestleMania main event" (which was shown on the April 6 episode of Raw). Also on the show, "The Fiend" Bray Wyatt defeated John Cena in a Firefly Fun House match, which was the other match not filmed at the Performance Center and also produced as a cinematic match, and Charlotte Flair defeated Rhea Ripley to win the NXT Women's Championship, which was the first time an NXT title was defended at WrestleMania. Also on Part 2, Edge had his first singles match since 2011 in which he defeated Randy Orton in a Last Man Standing match.

WrestleMania 37 would take place as a two-night event on April 10–11 at Raymond James Stadium in Tampa, Florida, the original location of WrestleMania 36, to allow for fan attendance—making it the first WWE event to have ticketed fans in attendance during the pandemic, though to a limited capacity of 25,000 for each night. In the main event for WrestleMania 37 Night 1, Bianca Belair defeated Sasha Banks to win the SmackDown Women's Championship, which was the first time two African-American women headlined WrestleMania. Also on the card, Bobby Lashley defeated Drew McIntyre by technical submission to retain the WWE Championship and celebrity Bad Bunny teamed with Damian Priest and defeated The Miz and John Morrison. In the main event of Night 2, Roman Reigns retained the Universal Championship against Edge and Daniel Bryan in a triple threat match.

WrestleMania 38 took place on April 2 and 3, 2022, at AT&T Stadium in Arlington, Texas once again as a two-night event. As most COVID-19 restrictions had been lifted by that point, this was the first full capacity WrestleMania since 2019, and established a new format for WrestleMania Weekend – a special live WrestleMania SmackDown featuring the Andre the Giant Memorial Battle Royal (a recent WrestleMania night staple) immediately followed by the 2022 WWE Hall of Fame inductions on Friday April 1, and NXT holding their Stand & Deliver event the afternoon of April 2 – all at the American Airlines Arena in nearby Dallas, which also hosted the Raw After WrestleMania on Monday April 4. At WrestleMania 38 itself, Cody Rhodes returned as Seth Rollins’ “mystery opponent”, defeating Rollins in Night 1. In the main event of Night 1, Stone Cold Steve Austin came out of retirement for a one match return to defeat Kevin Owens. In the main event of Night 2 Roman Reigns defeated Brock Lesnar in a Winner Takes All match for the WWE Championship and WWE Universal Championship, becoming the first wrestler to hold both titles simultaneously.

Celebrity involvement

Over the years, WrestleMania has featured many celebrity appearances with varying levels of involvement. The main event of the first WrestleMania showcased numerous celebrities along with the wrestlers. Billy Martin served as ring announcer with Liberace as timekeeper, and Muhammad Ali served as an official. Mr. T competed in the main event alongside tag team partner, Hulk Hogan. WrestleMania 2 featured a 20-man battle royal pitting several NFL players against WWF wrestlers, while Lawrence Taylor defeated Bam Bam Bigelow in the main event of WrestleMania XI. Mike Tyson appeared at WrestleMania XIV as the special guest enforcer for the WWF Championship bout between Shawn Michaels and Steve Austin, while professional boxer Butterbean was challenged to a boxing match by Bart Gunn at WrestleMania XV. At WrestleManias XIV, XV, and 2000, Pete Rose became involved in a short feud with Kane that became a running gag with each appearance ending with Rose receiving a Tombstone piledriver or chokeslam from Kane. Big Show faced sumo wrestling yokozuna Akebono in a sumo contest at WrestleMania 21, and fought professional welterweight boxer Floyd Mayweather Jr. at WrestleMania XXIV. Jersey Shore star Nicole "Snooki" Polizzi competed in a 6-person tag team match teaming with Trish Stratus and John Morrison in a winning effort against Dolph Ziggler and LayCool (Layla and Michelle McCool), at WrestleMania XXVII.

The event has also featured live musical performances. Ray Charles, Aretha Franklin, Gladys Knight, Willie Nelson, Reba McEntire, Little Richard, Boyz II Men, Ashanti, Boys Choir of Harlem, Michelle Williams, John Legend, Nicole Scherzinger, Fantasia Barrino, and Keri Hilson have each renditioned the songs "The Star-Spangled Banner" or "America the Beautiful" before the show. Robert Goulet performed "O Canada" at WrestleMania VI. Acts such as Motörhead, Limp Bizkit, Saliva, Run–D.M.C., Salt-n-Pepa, Living Colour, Ice-T, Drowning Pool, Flo Rida, P.O.D., Machine Gun Kelly, Rev Theory, Mark Crozer, and Snoop Dogg have also performed during the live entrances of competitors.

WrestleMania Axxess

In 1988, in association with The Trump Organization, WWF prepared a small festival to celebrate WrestleMania IV, which included autograph signings, a brunch, and a 5K run; the event was held again in 1989 for WrestleMania V. In 1992, a festival was held the day of WrestleMania VIII which included a WWF superstar look-alike contest and a tournament for the WWF WrestleFest arcade game. In 1993, the WWF held a "WrestleMania Brunch" the day of WrestleMania IX at Caesars Palace, during the course of which Lex Luger attacked Bret Hart. In 1994, WWF offered "Fan Fest" for the weekend of WrestleMania X, which allowed fans to step inside a WWF ring, participate in games, meet superstars, and purchase merchandise; the event was followed up in 1995 with another "Fan Fest" for WrestleMania XI. For WrestleMania XV, a pre-event concert known as the "WrestleMania Rage Party" (in reference to that year's theme, "The Ragin' Climax") was held at the Pennsylvania Convention Center and televised by USA Network in an hour-long special, featuring performances by Isaac Hayes and Big Pun.

The following year WWF held its first WrestleMania Axxess event at the Anaheim Convention Center expanding upon the party idea of WrestleMania Rage Party. The event included autograph signings and mementos to inductees of the WWE Hall of Fame. There were also activities where fans could enter a wrestling ring and commentate a wrestling match. In 2001, WrestleMania Axxess was held at the Reliant Hall which expanded upon the event by adding numerous activities including areas where attendees could buy special merchandise, see a production truck and check out special WWE vehicles. From 2002, WrestleMania Axxess would be extended to a three-day event (March 14–16) and would be held at the Canadian National Exhibition. The three-day event included similar activities to that of the one-day line-up. 2003 would be the final WrestleMania Axxess at a convention center for 6 years. From 2004 to 2008, WrestleMania Axxess visited cities around the United States and Canada with a smaller touring version of what was previously presented at regular Axxess events. In 2009 WrestleMania Axxess returned, and has continued every year since, as a four-day event held at convention centers and arenas in the host city of that year's WrestleMania.

Events

See also
 List of WWE pay-per-view and WWE Network events
 Starrcade, the premier event produced by the National Wrestling Alliance and the defunct World Championship Wrestling
 November to Remember, the premier event produced by the defunct Extreme Championship Wrestling
 FMW Anniversary Show, the premier event produced by the defunct Frontier Martial-Arts Wrestling
 Euro Catch Festival, the premier event produced by the defunct Catch Wrestling Association
 Ultima Lucha, the premier event produced by the defunct Lucha Underground
 Bound for Glory, the premier event produced by Impact Wrestling
 Final Battle, the premier event produced by Ring of Honor
 Wrestle Kingdom, the premier event produced by New Japan Pro Wrestling
 CMLL Anniversary Show, the premier event produced by Consejo Mundial de Lucha Libre
 Triplemanía, the premier event produced by Lucha Libre AAA Worldwide
 NWA Anniversary Show, the premier event produced by National Wrestling Alliance
 WWC Aniversario, the premier event produced by World Wrestling Council (WWC)
 SuperFight, the premier event produced by Major League Wrestling (MLW)
 Double or Nothing, the premier event produced by All Elite Wrestling (AEW)

Notes

References

Further reading

See also 
 Wrestlepalooza

External links

 
 WrestleMania history
 WrestleMania: Happy 25th!  – slideshow by Life

 
Recurring events established in 1985
1985 establishments in the United States